{{Automatic taxobox
|image = Glossy Grass Skink (Pseudemoia rawlinsoni) 2.jpg
|image_caption = Pseudemoia rawlinsoni'
|taxon = Pseudemoia
|authority = Fuhn, 1967
|subdivision_ranks = Species
|subdivision = 6, see text
}}Pseudemoia is a genus of skinks native to southeastern Australia. For similar skinks see genera Bassiana, Lampropholis, and Niveoscincus.

Reproduction
At least in P. entrecasteauxii, P. pagenstecheri, and P. spenceri, a placenta-like structure is formed during pregnancy to pass nutrients to the developing offspring. Similar mammal-like adaptations also occur in the skink genera Chalcides, Eumecia, Mabuya, Niveoscincus, and Trachylepis.

Species
Six species are recognized.Pseudemoia. The Reptile Database. www.reptile-database.org.Pseudemoia baudini  – Baudin's skink, Bight Coast skinkPseudemoia cryodroma  – alpine bog skinkPseudemoia entrecasteauxii  – southern grass skink, tussock cool-skink, tussock skink, Entrecasteaux's skinkPseudemoia pagenstecheri  – southern grass tussock skink, southern tussock grass skinkPseudemoia rawlinsoni  – Rawlinson's window-eyed skinkPseudemoia spenceri  – trunk-climbing cool-skink

References

Further reading
Fuhn IE (1967). "Pseudemoia, eine neue monotypische Gattung aus Südostaustralien (Ablepharus/Emoa/spenceri Lucas und Frost, 1894) [= Pseudemoia, a new monotypic genus from southeastern Australia (Ablepharus/Emoa/spenceri Lucas and Frost, 1894)".  Zoologischer Anzeiger 179: 243–247. (Pseudemoia, new genus). (in German).
Hutchinson MN, Donnellan SC (1992). "Taxonomy and genetic variation in the Australian lizards of the genus Pseudemoia (Scincidae: Lygosominae)". Journal of Natural History'' 26 (1): 215–264.

 
Lizard genera
Skinks of Australia
Taxa named by Ion Eduard Fuhn